Pancoran may refer to several places in Indonesia:
Pancoran, West Jakarta, a Chinatown in West Jakarta
Pancoran Market, a market in the Chinatown area
Pancoran, South Jakarta, a subdistrict of South Jakarta
Pancoran, Pancoran, an administrative village (kelurahan) in Pancoran subdistrict
Pancoran Mas, a subdistrict of Depok, West Java